Cumberland Hill is a census-designated place (CDP) in the town of Cumberland, in Providence County, Rhode Island, United States. The population was 7,934 at the 2010 census.

Geography
Cumberland Hill is located at  (41.970798, -71.459718).

Demographics

As of the census of 2000, there were 7,738 people, 3,054 households, and 2,204 families residing in the CDP. The population density was 908.1/km2 (2,355.5/mi2). There were 3,109 housing units at an average density of 364.9/km2 (946.4/mi2). The racial makeup of the CDP was 96.89% White, 0.39% African American, 0.03% Native American, 1.28% Asian, 0.04% Pacific Islander, 0.53% from other races, and 0.85% from two or more races. Hispanic or Latino of any race were 1.25% of the population.

There were 3,054 households, out of which 33.7% had children under the age of 18 living with them, 60.8% were married couples living together, 8.5% had a female householder with no husband present, and 27.8% were non-families. 23.4% of all households were made up of individuals, and 10.7% had someone living alone who was 65 years of age or older. The average household size was 2.53 and the average family size was 3.01.

In the CDP, the population was spread out, with 24.6% under the age of 18, 5.0% from 18 to 24, 33.6% from 25 to 44, 21.7% from 45 to 64, and 15.0% who were 65 years of age or older. The median age was 38 years. For every 100 females, there were 93.3 males. For every 100 females age 18 and over, there were 89.5 males.

The median income for a household in the CDP was $57,697, and the median income for a family was $68,361. Males had a median income of $44,332 versus $31,650 for females. The per capita income for the CDP was $28,879. About 2.2% of families and 2.9% of the population were below the poverty line, including 1.1% of those under age 18 and 6.8% of those age 65 or over.

References

Census-designated places in Providence County, Rhode Island
Villages in Providence County, Rhode Island
 
Providence metropolitan area
Villages in Rhode Island
Census-designated places in Rhode Island